Urs Räber (born 28 November 1958) is a former Swiss alpine skier, who won the 1984 World Cup in Downhill skiing.

Raber also competed in two Olympic Downhill events.  Firstly at the 1980 Winter Olympics in Lake Placid, where he finished 18th in the Olympic downhill, and then in the 1984 Winter Olympics in Sarajevo where he finished fifth in the Olympic downhill.

Raber now owns the Hotel Schönbuhl in Wilderswil near Interlaken in the Swiss canton of Berne.

World Cup Downhill victories

References

External links
 
 
 
 Urs Räber's Hotel
 Photo of Urs

1958 births
Living people
Swiss male alpine skiers
Olympic alpine skiers of Switzerland
Alpine skiers at the 1980 Winter Olympics
Alpine skiers at the 1984 Winter Olympics
FIS Alpine Ski World Cup champions